The 1863 West Virginia gubernatorial election, held on May 28, resulted in the victory of Arthur I. Boreman. He received the nomination of the Unconditional Union Party and won with no opposition in the general election.

Background

On April 17, 1861, the Virginia Secession Convention voted in favor of succession from the United States and joining the Confederate States of America. On May 13, the First Wheeling Convention was held with the purpose of reorganizing the Virginian government and remaining in the United States. On May 23, 125,950 Virginians voted in favor of the Secession Ordinance against 20,373 people.

On June 11, the Second Wheeling Convention was held and Arthur I. Boreman was selected to serve as its chairman. On June 20, the convention called for returning to the United States and selected Francis Harrison Pierpont to serve as governor until an election was held. On October 24, a referendum on statehood approval received 18,408 votes in favor and 781 against. On June 20, 1863, West Virginia was admitted as a state.

Unconditional Union primary

From May 6 to 7, 1863, the Unconditional Union Party's state convention was held to nominate candidates for multiple political offices. For the party's gubernatorial nomination Samuel Crane was nominated by James G. West, Boreman was nominated by E. M. Norton, and Peter G. Van Winkle was nominated by Ben Smith.

On the first ballot Van Winkle received a plurality of the vote, but did not receive the nomination due to a majority being required. West withdrew Crane's nomination before the second ballot in which Boreman defeated Van Winkle.

Candidates
Arthur I. Boreman
Samuel Crane
James W. Paxton
Peter G. Van Winkle

Results

General election

On May 28, 1863, Boreman won the gubernatorial election without opposition.

Results

Results by county

References

1863
gubernatorial
West Virginia
May 1863 events
Single-candidate elections